The Tower of Jewels is the centerpiece of Lakeside Amusement Park at the town of Lakeside, Colorado, just west of Denver. One of the tallest buildings in Colorado when it was built, it stands 150 feet tall and features over 5,000 lights.

The tower was designed by prominent Denver architect Edwin H. Moorman, and ground was broken on September 24, 1907. It was originally topped by a great 10 kilocandela spotlight used on the Ferris Wheel at the 1904 St. Louis World's Fair. The tower building itself was originally the park casino and casino theater, and today houses park offices. It is one of the original 15 buildings of the park, built by the Lakeside Realty & Amusement Company (commonly known as the Brewers Syndicate), headed by prominent Denver brewer Adolph Zang and including Godfrey Schirmer, Peter J. Friederich, John A. Keefe and Albert Lewin.

References

Towers in Colorado
Buildings and structures in Jefferson County, Colorado
1900s establishments in Colorado
Towers completed in the 1900s